Jaboatão dos Guararapes is a city in the state of Pernambuco, Brazil. It is a part of the Recife metro area. The population was 706,867 according to the Brazilian Institute of Geography and Statistics (IBGE) in 2020, making it the second most-populous city in the state of Pernambuco and the 27th in Brazil, ahead of major Brazilian state capitals such as Cuiabá and Aracaju. The city is a very important industrial center, hosting companies like Unilever and Coca-Cola. It is bordered by Recife in the north, Cabo de Santo Agostinho on the south, and Mangue forests to the west in Moreno.

Geography
It has three urban beaches (Piedade, Candeias and Barra de Jangada). Some of the main neighborhoods are Candeias, Cavaleiro, Piedade, Jardim Piedade and Barra de Jangada.
 State – Pernambuco
 Region – RMR (Recife)
 Boundaries – Sao Lourenco da Mata and Recife (N), Cabo de Santo Agostinho (S ), Moreno (W), Atlantic Ocean (E)
 Area – 256.073 km2 (99 sq mi)
 Elevation – 76 m (247 ft)
 Hydrography – small coaster rivers
 Rivers – Jaboatão, Gurjaú and Jordão
 Urban Beaches – Piedade, Candeias and Barra de Jangada
 Vegetation – Atlantic forest, Mangal and Sugarcane
 Climate – Hot tropical and humid
 Annual average temperature – 28 c
 Metro – Recife Metro
 Main roads – BR 101, BR 232, BR-408, PE-007, PE-008 (Batalha's Road) and PE-017 (Axis of Integration)
 Main ways – Bernado Vieira de Melo Avenue, Beira-Mar (Seaside) Avenue, Curcurana's Road, Manoel Rabelo's Avenue, Castelo Branco's Avenue, Barreto de Menezes Avenue, Ayrton Senna's Avenue, Setúbal Channel Avenue, President Kennedy's Avenue, Aniceto Varejão Street and Arão Lins de Andrade Street

History 

The unclassified extinct Arapoá language was spoken around Jaboatão.

The city of Jaboatão dos Guararapes was founded on 4 May 1593 by Bento Luiz Figueira, the third owner of Engenho São João Baptista. The Second Battle of Guararapes occurred in the city and was one of the most important battles in Brazil's history, in which the people from Pernambuco defeated and expelled the Dutch from the State. This battle was an important event that led to the creation of the Brazilian Army. In 1873 it ascended to village status, and in 1884 after being split up with Olinda it ascended to city status.

Demographics

In 2009, the city population estimated by IGBE was 687,688, however, local politicians criticized the research claiming that there were more people living in the city than were on the census. Notwithstanding, IBGE did not redo the survey. Its population makes it the 2nd most populous city in the state of Pernambuco, 9th in the Northeast region and the 26th in the whole country.

Economy

The main economic activities in Jaboatao dos Guararapes are based in tourism, commerce, beverage industry and transportation industry.

Economic indicators

Health indicators

See also
 Pernambuco museums
 Pernambuco beaches

References

External links
 City Guide

Populated places established in 1593
Populated coastal places in Pernambuco
Municipalities in Pernambuco